Judith Ingolfsson (born in Reykjavík, Iceland) is a violinist.

Biography 

The New York Times characterized her playing as producing “both fireworks and a singing tone,” the Washington Post praised the “finely honed bowing and stylistic finesse” of her playing, and Strings Magazine described her tone as “gorgeous, intense, and variable, flawlessly pure and beautiful in every register.”

At the latest since winning the first prize at the renowned International Violin Competition of Indianapolis, Iceland-native Judith Ingolfsson celebrated the final breakthrough as an internationally sought-after soloist and has performed in many of the world’s most famous venues, including, for example, the Konzerthaus Berlin, the Tokyo City Opera, the Kennedy Center in Washington D.C., and New York’s Carnegie Hall.

She has appeared with the Philadelphia Orchestra, the National Symphony Orchestra, the Indianapolis Symphony Orchestra, the St. Louis Symphony Orchestra, the Royal Chamber Orchestra of Tokyo, the Budapest Philharmonic Orchestra, the Jena Philharmonic, the Philharmonischen Staatsorchester Mainz, the Bollington Festival Orchestra (UK), and the Brandenburgisches Staatsorchester Frankfurt (Oder). She had collaborated with conductors such as Wolfgang Sawallisch, Raymond Leppard, Gilbert Varga, Jesús López-Cobos, Rico Saccani, Gerard Schwarz, and Leonard Slatkin.

Her concerts have taken her through almost the entire USA and to many other countries, including Germany, the Czech Republic, Russia, Japan, Hungary, Iceland, Puerto Rico, Panama, and Macau.
She began to play violin at the age of three, and gave her debut as a soloist with orchestra in Germany already at the age of eight. She moved to the USA and then in her early teens to Philadelphia in order to study with the legendary Jascha Brodsky at the Curtis Institute of Music. She subsequently studied at the Cleveland Institute of Music in the classes of David Cerone and Donald Weilerstein.
Not only did she win a gold medal at the Indianapolis Competition, but she was also a prizewinner at the Premio Paganini Competition in Genoa and at the Concert Artists Guild Competition in New York. In 1999 she was honored by National Public Radio as Debut Artist of the Year, and in 2001 received the Chamber Music America/WQXR Record Award for her debut CD with works by Bloch, Rorem, Bach, and Wieniawski.

Judith’s discography meanwhile includes four further CDs: Tchaikovsky’s Violin Concerto (BPO LIVE, 2008), “Simon Laks en hommage” (EDA, 2010), the Six Solo Sonatas by Eugène Ysaÿe (GENUIN, 2011), and works by Stravinsky and Shostakovich with pianist Vladimir Stoupel (AUDITE, 2011).

Also a welcome guest at music festivals, Judith has accepted invitations to festivals in the USA, Poland, Finland, Germany, Switzerland, France, and the Netherlands. In 2010 she was artist-in-residence in Villa Esche in Chemnitz. In 2009, together with Vladimir Stoupel, she founded her own festival “Aigues-Vives en Musiques” in the south of France.

Judith Ingolfsson is also an avid chamber musician and has collaborated with the Vogler, Avalon, and Miami String Quartet, the Broyhill Chamber Ensemble, and the Ronen Chamber Ensemble. Judith Ingolfsson performs regularly with Russian pianist Vladimir Stoupel as The Ingolfsson-Stoupel Duo. The Duo devotes itself to unusual repertoire and dynamic duo programs that expand the form of the traditional violin-piano recital, and performs in the USA, Switzerland, Poland, Italy, France, and Germany, for example, at the Schleswig-Holstein Music Festival.

Judith has a special interest in less well-known twentieth-century composers such as Simon Laks and Haflidi Hallgrimsson, or the Swedish composers Amanda Maier and Laura Netzel. With the Jena Philharmonic and the Staatsorchester Mainz, she recently performed the Violin Concertos by Rautavaara and Roslawez. Baroque compositions, such as the works for solo violin by Telemann and Tartini, she plays on the modern violin while taking into consideration historical performance practice.

Judith’s intensive occupation with the texts of the compositions has repeatedly led to collaborations with music publishers. Thus she has also been active as an editor, for example, of the Trois Pieces de Concert by Simon Laks, which has appeared in her arrangement for violin and piano.

In the 2013/2014 season, Judith is looking forward to several appearances with the Brandenburgisches Staatsorchester Frankfurt with whom she will interpret violin concertos by Khachaturian and Paganini. She will also be heard in violin recitals in the Konzerthaus Berlin as well as in Stuttgart, Chemnitz, and other German cities. In addition she is to give concerts in France and Croatia, and will tour the USA in March 2014.

Since 2008, Judith Ingolfsson has been Professor at the Stuttgart Hochschule für Musik und darstellende Kunst. She plays a violin by Lorenzo Guadagnini from 1750.

References

External links 
 
 Website of the Ingolfsson – Stoupel Duo
 Faculty Page at the Peabody Institute of the Johns Hopkins University 

Living people
Cleveland Institute of Music alumni
University of Colorado faculty
Judith Ingolfsson
Violin pedagogues
Judith Ingolfsson
21st-century classical violinists
Women classical violinists
Icelandic violinists
Year of birth missing (living people)